The Nantong Stadium is a multi-purpose stadium in Nantong, China.  It is currently used mostly for football matches.  The stadium holds 22,000 spectators.  It opened in 2010.

References

Football venues in China
Multi-purpose stadiums in China
Retractable-roof stadiums
Sports venues in Jiangsu